Takako Shirai may refer to:
 Takako Shirai (volleyball)
 Takako Shirai (singer)